Longifolene is the common (or trivial) chemical name of a naturally occurring, oily liquid hydrocarbon found primarily in the high-boiling fraction of certain pine resins.  The name is derived from that of a pine species from which the compound was isolated, 
Chemically, longifolene is a tricyclic sesquiterpene.  This molecule is chiral, and the enantiomer commonly found in pines and other higher plants exhibits a positive optical rotation of +42.73°.  The other enantiomer (optical rotation −42.73°) is found in small amounts in certain fungi and liverworts.

Longifolene is also one of two most abundant aroma constituents of lapsang souchong tea, because the tea is smoked over pinewood fires.

Occurrence and syntheses
Terpentine obtained from Pinus longifolia (obsolete name for Pinus roxburghii Sarg.) contains as much as 20% of longifolene.

The laboratory synthesis of longifolene has attracted much syntheses.

Biosynthesis
The biosynthesis of longifolene begins with farnesyl diphosphate (1) (also called farnesyl pyrophosphate) by means of a cationic polycyclization cascade.  Loss of the pyrophosphate group and cyclization by the distal alkene gives intermediate 3, which by means of a 1,3-hydride shift gives intermediate 4.  After two additional cyclizations, intermediate 6 produces longifolene by a 1,2-alkyl migration.

Reactions
It reacts with borane to give the derivative dilongifolylborane, which is a chiral hydroborating agent.

References

External links
 Longifolene Total Syntheses @ SynArchive.com

Polycyclic nonaromatic hydrocarbons
Sesquiterpenes
Total synthesis